Marble is a type of rock resulting from the metamorphism of limestone.

Marble or Marbles may also refer to:
Marble (toy), a small spherical toy usually made from glass, clay, steel, or agate
Marble sculpture, the art of creating three-dimensional forms from marble
The Elgin Marbles, for example

People 
Alice Marble (1913–1990), American tennis player
 Devyn Marble (born 1992), American basketball player 
Ella M. S. Marble (1850-1929), American physician

Places 
 Marble Island
In the United States
 Marble, Arkansas
 Marble, Colorado, a town
 Marble, Minnesota, a small city
 Marble, North Carolina
 Marble, Washington, an unincorporated community
 Marble, Wisconsin, a ghost town
 Marble Spring, a stream in Georgia
 Marble Township (disambiguation)
 Marbles Kids Museum in Raleigh, North Carolina

Books
Marbles, play by Nigel Williams (author)
 Marbles, a fictional character, one of Snoopy's siblings from the comic strip Peanuts

Music
Marble (band), a Japanese musical duo
Marbles (band), the solo music project of Robert Schneider of The Apples in Stereo
The Marbles (duo), a 1960s English rock duo

Albums
Marble (Casiopea album), a 2004 album by Casiopea
Marble (Fanatic Crisis album), a 1996 album by Fanatic Crisis
Marbles (album), a 2004 album by Marillion

Other
 Marble Brewery (Manchester, England), a microbrewery
 Marble butterflies, American butterfly in the tribe Anthocharini
 Marble cheese of the cheddar family
 Marble fish or marbled flathead, the Pseudaphritis urvillii
 Marble (software), a free and open-source map program

See also
 Marbling (disambiguation)
 Blue Marble (disambiguation)